Mammola is a comune (municipality) in the Metropolitan City of Reggio Calabria in the Italian region Calabria, located about  southwest of Catanzaro and about  northeast of Reggio Calabria.  

Mammola borders the following municipalities: Agnana Calabra, Canolo, Cinquefrondi, Galatro, Giffone, Grotteria, San Giorgio Morgeto, Siderno.

People  
 Sal Albanese, a former New York City Councilman and candidate for Mayor elections 2013.
 Nick Mancuso, actor.
 Nik Spatari, internationally renowned artist and sculptor, creator and producer of the Park Museum Santa Barbara. 
 Alan Barillaro, director, animator and screenwriter.
 Vincenzo_Cotroni, Italian Canadian crime boss. Founder of the now called Rizzuto crime family.

Twin towns
  Mezdra, Bulgaria, February 4, 2007
  Saint-Clair-du-Rhône, France, May 17, 2010

References

External links
  Official website

Cities and towns in Calabria